The 2012 All-Ireland Senior Football Championship was the 126th edition of the GAA's premier inter-county Gaelic football tournament, played between 31 counties of Ireland (excluding Kilkenny who only take part in the hurling championship), London and New York.

The 2012 All-Ireland Senior Football Championship Final took place at Croke Park on 23 September 2012, with Donegal emerging victorious. Having reclaimed the Ulster Senior Football Championship with wins over Cavan, Derry, Tyrone and Down, they met and bet Kerry in the All-Ireland quarter-final, in what was widely considered the game of the Championship. They then overcame Cork in the semi-final and Mayo in the final in Jim McGuinness's second season in charge, allowing team captain Michael Murphy to hold the Sam Maguire Cup aloft.

Colm McFadden finished as the competition's top scorer and Karl Lacey was named the competition's best player.

Teams 
A total of 33 teams contested the championship. These included 31 teams from Ireland as well as London and New York. As in previous years, Kilkenny decided not to field a team.

Referees 
Ahead of the 2012 Championship, three referees joined the panel: Conor Lane of Banteer, Martin Higgins of Fermanagh and Barry Cassidy of Derry.

2012 Championship referees' panel

 Barry Cassidy (Derry)
 David Coldrick (Meath)
 Michael Collins (Cork)
 Maurice Deegan (Laois)

 Syl Doyle (Wexford)
 Marty Duffy (Sligo)
 Michael Duffy (Sligo)
 Derek Fahy (Longford)

 Rory Hickey (Clare)
 Martin Higgins (Fermanagh)
 Pádraig Hughes (Armagh)
 Eddie Kinsella (Laois)

 Conor Lane (Cork)
 Joe McQuillan (Cavan)
 Pádraig O'Sullivan (Kerry)
 Cormac Reilly (Meath)

Stadia and locations

Personnel and kits

Team summaries 

Sligo record their easiest ever championship win over New York.

Format 
The All-Ireland Senior Football Championship of 2012 was run on a provincial basis as usual. It was a knockout tournament with pairings drawn at random in the respective provinces – there was no seeds.

Each match was played as a single leg. If a match was drawn there was a replay. If that match ended in a draw a period of extra time was played; however, if both sides were still level at the end of extra time another replay would have taken place.

Connacht Championship
Quarter-finals: (3 matches) These were three matches between six of the Connacht teams drawn first. The three winning teams advanced to the semi-finals, while the three losing teams entered the All-Ireland qualifiers.

Semi-finals: (4 matches) The winners of the three quarter-final games joined the other two Connacht teams to make up the semi-final pairings. The two winning teams advanced to the final, while the two losing teams entered the All-Ireland qualifiers.

Final: (1 match) The winners of the two semi-finals contested this game. The winning team advanced to the All-Ireland quarter-final, while the losing team entered the All-Ireland qualifiers.

Leinster Championship
Preliminary round: (3 matches) These were three matches between six of the Leinster teams drawn first. The three winning teams advanced to the quarter-finals, while the three losing teams entered the All-Ireland qualifiers.

Quarter-finals: (4 matches) The winners of the three preliminary round games joined the other five Leinster teams to make up four quarter-final pairings. The four winning teams advanced to the semi-finals, while the four losing teams entered the All-Ireland qualifiers.

Semi-finals: (2 matches) The four winners of the quarter-finals made up the semi-final pairings. The two winning teams advanced to the final, while the two losing teams entered the All-Ireland qualifiers.

Final: (1 match) The winners of the two semi-finals contested this game. The winning team advanced to the All-Ireland quarter-final, while the losing team entered the All-Ireland qualifiers.

Munster Championship
Quarter-finals: (2 matches) These were to be two matches between four of the Munster teams drawn first. The two winning teams advanced to the semi-finals, while the two losing teams entered the All-Ireland qualifiers.

Semi-finals: (4 matches) The winners of the two quarter-final games joined the other two Munster teams to make up the semi-final pairings. The two winning teams advanced to the final, while the two losing teams entered the All-Ireland qualifiers.

Final: (1 match) The winners of the two semi-finals contested this game. The winning team advanced to the All-Ireland quarter-final, while the losing team entered the All-Ireland qualifiers.

Ulster Championship
Preliminary round: (1 match) This was a lone match between two of the Ulster teams drawn first. The winning team advanced to the quarter-finals, while the losing team entered the All-Ireland qualifiers.

Quarter-finals: (4 matches) The winners of the lone preliminary round game joined the other seven Ulster teams to make up four quarter-final pairings. The four winning teams advanced to the semi-finals, while the four losing teams entered the All-Ireland qualifiers.

Semi-finals: (2 matches) The four winners of the quarter-finals made up the semi-final pairings. The two winning teams advanced to the final, while the two losing teams entered the All-Ireland qualifiers.

Final: (1 match) The winners of the two semi-finals contested this game. The winning team advanced to the All-Ireland quarter-final, while the losing team entered the All-Ireland qualifiers.

Qualifiers
The qualifiers gave teams defeated in the provincial championships another chance at winning the All-Ireland title.

Round 1 (8 matches): the sixteen teams who failed to reach a provincial semi-final entered the qualifiers at this stage (New York do not compete). An open draw was made to determine the eight match pairings.

Round 2 (8 matches): the eight teams who failed to progress from their provincial semi-finals entered the qualifiers at this stage. They were paired with the eight winners from round 1 of the qualifiers. An open draw was made to determine the eight match pairings.

Round 3 (4 matches): the eight teams from round 2 of the qualifiers were paired against each other. An open draw was made to determine the four match pairings.

Round 4 (4 matches): the four teams who lost their provincial finals entered the qualifiers at this stage. They were paired with the four winners from round 3 of the qualifiers. An open draw was made to determine the four match pairings. The four winners advanced to the All-Ireland quarter-finals.

All-Ireland Series
Quarter-finals: (4 matches) the four teams from round 4 of the qualifiers were paired against the four provincial winners. An open draw was made to determine the four match pairings. The four winning teams advanced to the semi-finals, while the two losing teams were eliminated from the championship.

Semi-finals: (2 matches) The four winners of the quarter-finals make up the semi-final pairings. The two winning teams advanced to the final, while the two losing teams were eliminated from the championship.

Final: (1 match) The winners of the two semi-finals contested this game.

Fixtures and results

Munster Senior Football Championship

Leinster Senior Football Championship

Connacht Senior Football Championship

Ulster Senior Football Championship

All-Ireland qualifiers

Round 1 
On 18 June 2012, the draw was made for the first round of the All-Ireland qualifiers. This draw contained all the teams who had been knocked out of their provincial competitions prior to the semi final stage, apart from New York. It was broadcast live on RTÉ Radio 1's Morning Ireland for the first time.

Round 2 
On 2 July 2012, the draw was made for the second round of the All-Ireland qualifiers. This draw contained all the teams who had been knocked out of their provincial competitions at the semi final stage in one pot and the winners of the first round of the qualifiers in the second pot.

Round 3

Round 4

All-Ireland series

Quarter-finals

Semi-finals

Final

Championship statistics

Miscellaneous 

 Clare beat Limerick for the first time since 1984.
 Cork played Clare in the Munster final for the first time since 1949.
 Donegal won their first All Ireland since 1992.

Scoring 

First goal of the championship: Stephen Coen for Sligo against New York (Connacht quarter-final)
Widest winning margin: 24 points
Sligo 3-21 – 0-06 New York (Connacht quarter-final)
Most goals in a match: 5
Mayo 3-18 – 2-09 Down (All Ireland quarter-final)
Most points in a match: 35
Mayo 0-19 – 0-16 Dublin (All Ireland Semi-final)
Most goals by one team in a match: 4
Mayo 4-20 – 0-10 Leitrim (Connacht Semi-final)
 Highest aggregate score: 42 points
Mayo 4-20 – 0-10 Leitrim (Connacht Semi-final)
Lowest aggregate score: 17 points
Sligo 0-04 – 0-13 Kildare (fourth round)
Most goals scored by a losing team: 2
London 2-09 – 2-11 Antrim (first round)
Longford 0-17 – 2-8 Derry (first round)
Mayo 3-18 – 2-9 Down (All Ireland quarter-final)

Top scorers 

Season

Single game

Awards 
Monthly

Sunday Game Team of the Year
The Sunday Game team of the year was picked on 23 September, the night of the final and included 8 of Donegal's winning team.

GAA/GPA All Stars

 Player has previously been selected.

County breakdown
 Donegal = 8
 Mayo = 4
 Cork = 2
 Dublin = 1

List of nominees

See also 
 2012 All-Ireland Minor Football Championship
 2012 National Football League (Ireland)
 "Jimmy's Winning Matches", a song
 Jimmy's Winnin' Matches, a documentary

References 

 
All-Ireland Senior Football Championship